This is a list of administrators and governors of Niger State. Niger State was formed on 3 February 1976 when it was split out from Sokoto State.

See also
States of Nigeria
List of state governors of Nigeria

References

Niger State